Mang may refer to:

Places
Mangshi, county-level city in Yunnan, China

People
Anton Mang (born 1949), German motorcycle racer
Henry Mang (1897–1987), Canadian politician
Mang of Xia, ruler of the Xia Dynasty, China
Rudolf Mang (1950–2018), German heavyweight weightlifter

Groups
Mang people, an ethnic group living primarily in Vietnam
Mang (caste), a caste of musicians and labourers in India

Other uses
Mang language, an Austroasiatic language of China and Vietnam
17460 Mang, a main-belt asteroid
Mang, a bat character in Rudyard Kipling's The Jungle Book
Mang, an honorific address to an older male person in the Philippines, as in Mang Kanor or Mang Tomas, almost equivalent to Sir or Mister. The equivalent honorific to an older female person is Aling, as in Aling Lucing.